Gary Seligson (born September 14, 1960) is an American drummer and percussionist from West Orange, New Jersey. A graduate of The Hart School, he is one of the most sought drummers in New York City. Gary has played in many Broadway hits including Tarzan, Aida and Wicked. He was also the drummer for Broadway show Billy Elliot's 3 year run, performing at the Imperial Theatre. Currently, Gary can be found at the Lunt-Fontanne Theatre where he is the percussionist for Broadway musical Motown.
Gary has performed and/or recorded with various artists including: Elton John, Phil Collins, The Rascals, Idina Menzel and many more.

He is also endorsed by Pearl, Sabian, Pro-Mark and Remo.

References

External links
 

1961 births
Place of birth missing (living people)
Living people
University of Hartford Hartt School
20th-century American drummers
American male drummers
20th-century American male musicians